Chain of Circumstance is a 1951 American drama film directed by Will Jason and written by David Lang. The film stars Richard Grayson, Margaret Field, Marta Mitrovich, Harold J. Kennedy, Helen Wallace and Connie Gilchrist. The film was released on August 23, 1951, by Columbia Pictures.

Cast          
Richard Grayson as Tom Dawson
Margaret Field as Dell Dawson
Marta Mitrovich as Evie Carpenter
Harold J. Kennedy as Marvin
Helen Wallace as Emily Greer
Connie Gilchrist as Mrs. Mullins
Lawrence Dobkin as Dr. Callen
Sumner Getchell as Fred Martindale
James Griffith as Sid
Oliver Blake as Traeger
Percy Helton as Fogel
Douglas Fowley as Lt. Fenning
Carleton Young as Lt. Sands

References

External links
 

1951 films
American drama films
1951 drama films
Columbia Pictures films
Films directed by Will Jason
American black-and-white films
1950s English-language films
1950s American films